A rivet nut, also known as a blind rivet nut, or rivnut, is a one-piece internally threaded and counterbored tubular rivet that can be anchored entirely from one side. It is a kind of threaded insert. There are two types: one is designed to form a bulge on the back side of the panel as a screw is tightened in its threads. The other is similarly drawn in using a screw, but is drawn into the sleeve instead of creating a bulge.

History 
The first rivet nut was created by BF Goodrich in the 1930s, and sold under the trademark RIVNUT®. It was first used to mount rubber de-icing boots to aircraft wings.

Usage 
In the field of aviation, rivet nuts are often used to attach various items, such as static dischargers and inspection access covers, to the surface of an aircraft. Rivet nuts are an ideal replacement for weld nuts because they will not distort base materials, eliminate weld splatter, toxic fumes, and other by-products of the welding process, and can be installed in many different kinds of material including steel, plastic, composites, and fiberglass.

See also 
 Swage nut
 Friction drilling

References

Notes

Bibliography 

.
.

Nuts (hardware)